Raven: The Island is a BBC Scotland children's adventure game show, and the first spin-off to the main series, Raven. It comprises one series, initially airing in 2006 on the CBBC Channel, and then during CBBC on BBC One. In this series, warriors compete as teams and attempt to complete the many challenges on the island of Alaunus, retrieving timepieces in the hope of defeating the evil Nevar.

Plot
Raven: The Island sees the island of Alaunus, Raven's homeland as a child, come under control by the evil force of Nevar and his demons. Raven has been exiled from the island, and so his close and trusted friend, Princess Erina, assists Raven's young warriors in their quest, with the help of her sprite companion, Haryad. Their only hope of restoring the Island lies with the three teams of four warriors, who must travel to the island and towards the ruined fortress that once belonged to Erina's father, collecting timepieces along the way that Nevar, unable to destroy them, has attempted to hide in perilous traps and challenges. Using the timepieces, together with an upcoming solar eclipse, they must then enter the fortress and take an acorn from the Great Oak, stolen and locked away by Nevar to cut new Staffs of Power for his elite demons, so that a new tree may be planted away from the island, far from Nevar's dark domain.

Format
Raven: The Island features a set of different challenges for the warriors, but differs in that the warriors are split into teams; in Raven: The Island, this consists of three groups of four. These teams have different animal associations and colour clothing; the Lions wear green clothing, the Wolves wear blue clothing, and the Eagles wear maroon. Each team also has a team leader, and follow separate paths to the fortress, undertaking different challenges along the way.

This series does not provide the concept of lives or rings: should a warrior fail a task by being caught by a demon, or fail to navigate an obstacle in a challenge, that warrior is instantly eliminated and plays no further part in the quest, and cannot be returned or brought back (in contrast to collecting rings in Raven, or exchanging jewels in the second spin-off, The Secret Temple).

Characters
Raven (James Mackenzie): Raven makes appearances in this series, but does not guide the warriors as frequently as in Raven, or The Secret Temple. He converses with Princess Erina on the warrior's progress, and talks to Cyrus to gain information about matters such as the upcoming eclipse, and the timepieces.

Princess Erina (Lindsay McKenzie): Raven's close and trusted friend. She carries a Staff of Power with her (topped with a crown carving) and is helped by a tree sprite named Haryad. Erina lives on the Island of Alaunus, which used to belong to her father before Nevar took it over with his dark magic, and is the one who leaves signs and clues to guide the warriors to Nevar's fortress. She cannot meet the warriors herself until the quest is over, for her life force, and that of her Staff of Power made from the ancient Oak, would guide demons straight to them.

Haryad (occasionally appears visible as a sprite, played by Jack Gilliland; voiced by Jo James): Erina's companion is a tree sprite – the spirit of the Great Oak that Nevar has stolen – who appears as a blue ball of light, and reports the warriors' progress back to her.

Cyrus the Astronomer (Michael MacKenzie, James Mackenzie's father): An old and wise astronomer who works out when the eclipse is due; he also discovered the many magical properties on Alaunus, such as the Time Wells and the Pearls of Wisdom, when sorcery returned to the island. His great knowledge has been passed on to Erina, and he is seen explaining such matters as the eclipse, and the nature and location of the timepieces, to Raven.

Nevar: The main antagonist of all the Raven stories, Nevar has seized control of Alaunus by capturing the Enchanted Oak, from which the Staffs of Power for Raven, Erina and his own were cut. He has locked it within the Ruins of the Castle of Alaunus, which he now controls, and has begun to cut Staffs of Power for his black-robed Elite Demons, slowly causing the death of the Oak.

Warriors
Twelve warriors started the quest, with four to each team. As with the main Raven series, each warrior is given their own warrior name, comprising a mix of letters from the first name and surname. Each team has a distinct animal association, and different colours for their outfits.

The teams and warriors are listed below, with yellow cells indicating the warriors escaped the island safely.

Challenges
Each team follows a different path using one third of the map of Alaunus that Erina has given them, and each faces different challenges along the way. Nevar, who cannot destroy the timepieces, instead hides them in locations difficult to reach, and from the fourth day – when timepieces become part of the challenges – the warriors may attempt to retrieve them if they so choose.

Lions
 Near Drune Hill, Directory: the team must use their map and identify stones using a riddle from their Rune Book to navigate their way forward.
 Edge of the Forest of Dawn Time, Symbol Path: after hanging the scattered rune boards on the trees in the correct places, the warriors must use a riddle in their Rune Book to find the two runes that denote which two trees they must walk through to continue their quest.
 Forest of Dawn Time, Stone Circle: the warriors must rebuild a circle of stones, eight of which have runes on their faces. Using the Rune Book, they must then decode the word, which will turn the circle to point the correct way forward.
 Forest of Dawn Time, Speed Run: the team members must jump to grab bags moving up and down above their heads, and open them to see if they contain a timepiece or worthless rocks. They must also watch out for the approaching wood demons, as Nevar hopes to trap the warriors by keeping them there for too long.
 Drune Hill, Stone Trolls: one of the Lions must climb Drune Hill and collect three timepieces hanging from stone trolls on the cliff face.
 Vale of Melwa, Time Well: the Lions must use one of the three Time Wells on the island to generate a timepiece, by reassembling the five stones according to the riddle in the Rune Book.
 Og Wood, Archery: targets that open and close must be hit to secure each of the four timepieces, but they must be wary of approaching demons, who will be alerted once the first target is hit.
 Devlin's Water, Raft Build: the Lions work to reconstruct a boat, broken by demons, and use it to retrieve the single timepiece on a small island in the middle of the water.
 Shadow Wood, Watch Tower: one Lion must climb an ancient watchtower, and walk over the narrow wooden plank connecting it to an adjoining tower, in order to collect a timepiece hanging from a stone gargoyle there, before making the return journey.
 Flint Drop, Abseiling: to continue their journey, each Lion must abseil down the cliff face.
 Loch Ula, Giant Lilies: one of the Lions must swim out to the giant lilies floating on the loch to retrieve timepieces, whilst avoiding the enchanted seed-pods, which will eliminate a warrior if touched.
 River of the Rising Moon, River Crossing: timepieces can be retrieved from the threads above the stepping stone path that provides a way across the river for the Lions. Norso fell into the river jumping onto the first stepping stone, and was eliminated.
 Stoorworm Marsh, Bog Crossing: the team must cross the deadly marsh by stepping across toadstools, and may collect timepieces that lie on poles at the sides of the marsh.
 Battle of Glen Morrigan, Bones of the Vanquished Warriors: to collect two timepieces, one blindfolded warrior must be guided through a field, littered with the remains of the final mighty battle against Nevar during the last eclipse. If they touch any part of the debris, they will be eliminated.

Wolves
 Forest of Dawn Time, Cairn Milestone: after rebuilding the shattered statue, whose face displays pictures, an arrow on the statue shows the true path forward.
 Forest of Dawn Time, Compass Stone: using a riddle in their Rune Book along with their compass, the warriors must correctly rotate the compass stone to find the correct two marker stones to continue their journey through.
 River of the Rising Moon, Thrall River: the warriors must travel upstream, avoiding the many thrall threads strung across the river's width that are connected to bells. If a warrior triggers a bell, they will alert the thrall demons to their presence, instantly ending their quest. This happened to Jenso, who touched one of the strings, and lost his place in the quest.
 Green Lady Wood, Archery: targets that open and close must be hit to secure each of the four timepieces, but they must be wary of approaching demons, who will be alerted once the first target is hit.
 Loch of Loarn, Giant Lilies: one of the Wolves must swim out to the giant lilies floating on the loch to retrieve timepieces, whilst avoiding the enchanted seed-pods, which will eliminate a warrior if touched.
 Mount Zoat, Abseiling: to continue their journey, each Wolf must abseil down the cliff face. Tanla, who had a fear of heights, did not undertake the challenge, and was eliminated.
 Triple Thorn Wood, Silent Collection: the Wolves must work silently to retrieve timepieces that move up and down, and that have bells attached. If they make any noise or ring a bell, the demon sentinels in the centre of the wood will eliminate them from their quest.
 Megrin's Mire, Bog Crossing: the team must cross the deadly mire by stepping across toadstools, and may collect timepieces that hang above them.
 River of the Leaping Salmon, River Crossing: two timepieces can be retrieved from the sides of the stepping stone path that provides a way across the river for the Wolves.
 Loch of Dana, Raft Build: the Wolves work to reconstruct a boat, broken by demons, and use it to retrieve the single timepiece on a small island in the middle of the water.
 Battle of Tallow Vale, Bones of the Vanquished Warriors: to collect two timepieces, one blindfolded warrior must be guided through a field, littered with the remains of the second mighty battle against Nevar during the last eclipse. If they touch any part of the debris, they will be eliminated.
 Sun Spear Hill, Stone Trolls: the Wolves must climb Sun Spear Hill and collect two timepieces hanging from stone gargoyles on the cliff face.
 Crane Wood, Time Well: the Wolves must use one of the three Time Wells on the island to generate a timepiece, by reassembling the five stones according to the riddle in the Rune Book.
 Hawk Wood, Watch Tower: one Wolf must climb an ancient watch tower and cross a tightrope connected to an adjacent platform, in order to retrieve a timepiece placed on it, before making the return journey.

Eagles
 River of the Leaping Salmon, River Crossing: the warriors must cross the river by rebuilding the bridge, placing wooden planks across stepping stones in the river.
 Grey Sky Mountain, Climbing: the team must climb the perilous cliff face to continue their journey.
 Valley of the Rusted Sword, Riddle Statue, The Frozen Warrior: a warrior carrying a shield and stick is frozen on the path, and symbols on his shield must be translated using the Rune Book. Once read out, the warrior will come alive and point the direction they must take.
 River of the Diving Bird, Time Piece Netting: a net at the far side of the river bank allows the warriors to straddle the river's stepping stones and catch the timepieces that are floating quickly downstream.
 Battle of Bryn Brahan, Bones of the Vanquished Warriors: to collect two timepieces, one blindfolded warrior must be guided through a field, littered with the remains of a mighty battle against Nevar during the last eclipse. If they touch any part of the debris, they will be eliminated.
 The Whispering Forest, Watch Tower: one Eagle must climb an ancient watch tower and cross a rope bridge to retrieve a timepiece on a platform, before making the return journey.
 Cannoch's Crag, Stone Trolls: two Eagles must climb the Crag and collect one timepiece each, hanging from points on the cliff face.
 Loch Corra, Giant Lilies: one of the Eagles must swim out to the giant lilies floating on the loch to retrieve timepieces, whilst avoiding the enchanted seed-pods, which will eliminate a warrior if touched.
 Fergus Holt, Archery: targets that open and close must be hit to secure each of the four timepieces, but they must be weary of approaching demons, who will be alerted once the first target is hit.
 Rowan's Wood, Time Well: the Eagles must use one of the three Time Wells on the island to generate a timepiece, by reassembling the five stones according to the riddle in the Rune Book.
 Bog O'Balor, Bog Crossing: the team must cross the deadly bog by stepping across toadstools, and may collect timepieces that hang above them. Masam did not jump far enough, and Cared slipped landing on a toadstool; both falling into the mud, they were eliminated.
 Triple Thorn Wood, Speed Run: the Eagles must jump to grab bags moving up and down above their heads, and open them to see if they contain a timepiece or worthless rocks. They must also watch out for the approaching wood demons, as Nevar hopes to trap the warriors by keeping them there for too long.
 Lochan Caer, Raft Build: the Eagles work to reconstruct a boat, broken by demons, and use it to retrieve the single timepiece on a small island in the middle of the water.
 Mount Gruagach, Abseiling: to continue their journey, each Eagle must abseil down the cliff face.

Fortress Approach
 Foothills of Mount Gruagach, Map Riddle: At the start of the final week, the surviving warriors from the three teams regroup to continue the quest together; at this point, the warriors have 45 timepieces between them. Putting the three pieces of the map together, the warriors decipher the runes around the edges of the map, which guide them to The Twisted Tree. The runes instruct them to dig near the tree, where they find a box containing a golden disc pendant, inscribed with a single rune, meaning success. This pendant will ultimately open the room within the fortress where the Great Oak is being held.
 Fortress Surroundings, Thrall Demons: Wood demons patrol the forest surrounding the fortress, so the warriors must pass through the thrall threads that are woven through the trees in the forest, in order to remain undetected by them. Any warriors that touch a thread, in turn causing any bells attached to ring, will be instantly eliminated by the demons that wait around the edges. Bayle, the first warrior to enter, triggered a bell by the exit; she was followed by Kaysa who was the next to attempt to exit. Both were eliminated from the quest, along with 17 timepieces they were carrying.
 Fortress Surroundings, Frozen Timepiece: to collect the final timepiece, the warriors must set up three telescopes in the correct positions to focus the sun's rays onto the timepiece, frozen on a pedestal in the centre. Wooden panels may also be rotated to avoid blocking the telescope's line of sight. They must also watch out for the fast approaching demons, alerted when the telescopes are moved.
 Hawk Wood, Nevar's Eye: a warrior must climb a watch tower and use the catapult on the platform to destroy Nevar's Eye, a crystal that allows Nevar to see all that occurs near the fortress. The remaining warriors collect stones to place in a basket which the warrior can pull up for use in the catapult. They must also watch out for demons sent by Nevar as the Eye is attacked.
 River of the Rising Moon, River Crossing: each warrior must cross the broken bridge by using two planks that slide across the poles that make up the sides of the bridge; pulling the attached rope will bring the planks back for the next warrior.
 Glade, Magic Stone: using a torch, the warriors must set alight a stone tablet, which will produce a riddle only when set on fire, and then only briefly; the warriors must write the riddle down before it disappears.
 Clearing, Secret Message: Erina sends a Rune message into the sky using her Staff of Power, in order to trick Nevar into believing the quest has failed and that no warriors remain. The warriors also translate the message, but become confused as to its meaning; using a Pearl of Wisdom gained on the first day, they ascertain the direction they must take, and acquire the Mirrored Shield they find on the ground as they go.
 Causeway Approach, Magic Potion: the group must concoct a draught to use against one of the demons found at the Causeway by following the riddle on the parchment.
 Fortress Causeway, Demon Vanquish: two demons stand guard on the Fortress Causeway; the first must be neutralised with the spell that was earlier written down. Simlo, who read out the spell which was incorrectly recorded by the warriors, was taken by the first demon whilst the others ran past; the second was successfully tranquilised using the potion they had made.

Fortress
 Fortress Wall, The Totality Clock: the warriors must feed the timepieces they have acquired into the Totality Clock, invented by Cyrus many years ago, which will lengthen the eclipse, in turn delaying the closing of the portal into the fortress. One warrior turns the handle which drives the rotating mechanism, into which timepieces are placed by another warrior; they must work together to time it correctly, so that the timepiece will fall into the feeding mechanism. Each timepiece successfully deposited will pour sand into the Clock's timer, ultimately lengthening the totality by one minute; should they time it incorrectly, the timepiece will miss the feeding mechanism and be lost. They must also look out for Nevar and his demon patrols, who still believe the warriors' mission has failed and are unaware of their presence.
 Outer Fortress, Catapult: with twelve timepieces inserted into the Clock, twelve minutes are available for the warriors to complete the quest. They must first knock down a wall using a catapult to retrieve a key, though they know this will alert Nevar to their presence.
 Fortress, Door to the Inner Chamber: using the reflection in the mirrored shield, the warriors must navigate a path to the chamber door without looking at the demons, which will eliminate them if they sense eyes looking at them directly. Once at the door, they must place their key into the fourth lock to open it.
 Fortress, Inner Chamber: the warriors must cross a rune path using a riddle from the Rune Book, and then traverse a beam that has swinging boulders across its length. Goram, who carried the pendant they had earlier received, was knocked from the obstacle course, and the pendant was lost.
 Fortress, Door to the Oak: to enter the room holding the Great Oak, the remaining warriors must solve the rotating locks on the door; the pendant was not needed, as the warriors remembered the symbol on it, and a further clue was given in the Rune Book.
 Fortress, The Great Oak: finally arriving at the Great Oak, a final riddle must be solved so that the one correct acorn of the three different types hanging from the branches (metallic, jewelled or normal acorn) is taken; picking the wrong one, or taking one without a pure heart, will end a warrior's quest.

Having taken the correct acorn, Delra, Corso and Tanel escape Nevar's attacks, protected by the acorn. They return to Erina and Haryad at the Waterfall of the Little Fawn, where they hand her they acorn; they then make to return to the mainland, where they can find Raven, and together plant a new tree that will help in their fight to rid the scourge of Nevar from Alaunus.

Production
The initial sequences, before the warriors arrive on the Island of Alaunus, were shot at Loch Lomond in Scotland. Most of the subsequent challenges were then filmed at Auchengillan International Outdoor Centre. 

The series was directed by Maria Stewart, who also directed the second spin-off, The Secret Temple. It was produced by Paul Hineman, director of the third and fourth series of the main Raven series.

See also
 Raven (2002 TV series)
 Raven: The Secret Temple
 Raven: The Dragon's Eye

References

External links
 
 Raven: Production Information and Stills

BBC children's television shows
Television series by BBC Studios
2000s British children's television series
2000s Scottish television series
2000s British game shows
2006 Scottish television series debuts